Venator (IPA: [we'na:tor]) is the Latin word for hunter. The feminine name is venatrix (IPA: [we'na:triks]). It may refer to:

 Venator (gladiator type), a type of Roman gladiator
 Venator (spider), a genus of spiders
 The Latinized surname of Niccolò Cacciatore (lat. Nicolaus Venator), 19th century astronomer
 Venator Group, the corporate successor to F.W. Woolworth's, Inc., now known as Foot Locker, Inc., a retail store
 Venator Materials, spin-off of the Pigments and Additives division of the Huntsman Corporation
 Venator, Oregon, a community in Harney County, Oregon, United States

See also
 List of commonly used taxonomic affixes, for the suffix "-venator", as used in taxonomy